"The Adventure of the Clapham Cook" is a short story by crime fiction writer Agatha Christie. It features the writer's famous investigator Hercule Poirot and his companion Captain Arthur Hastings. The story was first published in November 1923 in the British weekly journal, The Sketch, as part of the series, The Grey Cells of M. Poirot II. It also was featured in a collection of short stories entitled The Second Omnibus of Crime by author Dorothy L. Sayers first published in 1932. It first appeared in book form in the U.S. in 1951 as part of the collection, The Under Dog and Other Stories. In the UK, the story was featured in the collection entitled  Poirot's Early Cases first published in September 1974.

Plot 
Poirot is not interested in investigating some of the cases which appear in the newspapers and which Hastings tries to bring to his attention. These include a bank clerk (Mr. Davis) who disappears with fifty thousand pounds of securities, a suicidal man and a missing typist. 
He is put on the spot, though, when visited by a Mrs. Todd who is determined that he investigate her missing cook, Eliza Dunn. Challenged, he decides, with some humor and to avoid an argument, to take the seemingly trivial case. 
Eliza Dunn, a middle-aged woman, has walked out of her job at the Todds' house in Clapham two days earlier without giving her notice and has not communicated with her employer since, except for sending for her trunk that day.

Interviewing the maid in the house, Poirot finds out that the trunk was already packed, meaning that Eliza had planned to leave even though her departure was swift. The other occupants of the house are Mr. Todd, who works in the city, and their lodger, Mr Simpson, who works in the same bank at which Mr. Davis (the man who has disappeared with  fifty thousand pounds of securities) worked. 
Struck by this coincidence as he is, Poirot cannot see a connection between an absconding bank clerk and a missing cook. 
Poirot places advertisements in all the newspapers inquiring as to the whereabouts of Eliza and several days later he is successful in locating her. He travels to visit her and she tells him a story of having come into a legacy of a house in Carlisle and an income of three hundred pounds a year, dependent upon her taking up the offer and immediately leaving domestic service. This legacy was communicated to her by a man who approached her in the street as she was returning to the Todds' house one night. The money came from a friend of her late grandmother who had settled in Australia and married a wealthy settler. Eliza had immediately taken the train north and a couple of days later received her belongings from Clapham, although wrapped in paper parcels and not in her old trunk, which she supposes had been kept behind by Mrs. Todd in a fit of pique.

Poirot rushes back to Clapham with Hastings and explains matters on the way. Simpson knew what his colleague Davis was up to at the bank. He killed the man for the securities and needed an old, inconspicuous trunk in which to hide the body and that meant diverting Eliza out of the way. It was Simpson in disguise who had approached her the street. On arriving at Clapham, Simpson has already disappeared but is traced to an ocean liner bound for the United States. The trunk with Davis' body inside is located at a Glasgow railway station. Poirot views the link between a disappearing cook and a murder to be one of his most interesting cases, and he frames the cheque sent by Mr. Todd for his consulting fee as a reminder of it.

Adaptations  
On 8 January 1989, "The Adventure of the Clapham Cook" premiered as the first episode of the TV series Agatha Christie’s Poirot, starring David Suchet in the title role.

The story was also adapted for the Japanese anime television series Agatha Christie's Great Detectives Poirot and Marple, as a two-part episode titled "The Disappearing Cook" in which Poirot worked with Miss Marple's great niece, Mabel West, to solve the mystery.

References 

1923 short stories
Books by Agatha Christie
British short stories
Clapham
Detective fiction short stories
Hercule Poirot
Short stories set in London
Works about missing people
Works originally published in The Sketch